Mirko Conte (born 12 August 1974) is an Italian professional football coach and former player who is the assistant coach of  club Juventus U23.

Managerial career
On 22 August 2020, Conte was appointed assistant coach of Serie C club Juventus U23, the reserve team of Juventus.

References

External links
 Career summary by playerhistory.com 

1974 births
Living people
Italian footballers
Serie A players
Serie B players
Inter Milan players
Venezia F.C. players
Piacenza Calcio 1919 players
S.S.C. Napoli players
L.R. Vicenza players
U.C. Sampdoria players
A.C.R. Messina players
S.S. Arezzo players
A.S.D. Olimpia Colligiana players
Association football defenders
Association football coaches